The Tonhalle is a concert hall in Zurich, home to the Tonhalle-Orchester Zürich, one of Switzerland's leading orchestras. The 1455-seat hall, located at Claridenstrasse 7 in Zurich, was inaugurated in 1895 by Johannes Brahms. The hall is considered to be "acoustically superb". Since 1939, it is part of the building complex Kongresshaus Zürich.

Building
The Tonhalle was built between 1893 and 1895, and designed by the Viennese architects Ferdinand Fellner and Hermann Helmer, who had built the Zurich Opera House and many theaters and concert halls in Europe. The architects had become especially experienced in acoustics, and also achieved excellent acoustics in the Tonhalle. In his comparison of concert halls and opera houses, Leo Leroy Beranek found the Grosser Saal (Great Hall) "an excellent hall", agreeing with three out of four conductors whom he had interviewed, adding "Music critics have generally given high praise to the acoustics". Johannes Brahms conducted his Triumphlied, Op. 55 for the opening on 19 October 1895.

The two concert halls remained mostly unchanged, protected as a historic monument since 1981.

In 1988, to replace the original organ built in 1872 by the Swiss manufacturer Johann Nepomuk Kuhn, the Tonhalle was equipped with a pipe organ built by the German firm Kleuker-Steinmeyer. The organist and organ consultant Jean Guillou was instrumental in its design.

Plans to replace the Kongresshaus with a new convention center were submitted in 2006 but rejected in 2008. Renovations were planned for the 2013/14 season.

Major renovation works on the hall began in 2017, which included the removal of the old organ and installation of a new one built by the firm Kuhn. The old organ was donated to the Koper Cathedral in Slovenia.

History 
In 1950, Josef Müller-Brockmann produced his first of many concert posters for the Tonhalle concert hall in Zurich, which became known as the Tonhalle Series or "Musica Viva". The Tonhalle Series grew increasingly abstract and focused on the feelings of the music. Müller-Brockman used a visual form to translate the mathematical system that is found in music, playing with visual scale, rhythm, and repetition, while trying to stay true to each musicians composition who was featured on the poster.

References

External links
 Tonhalle Pipe Organ Page
 Tonhalle Orchester Zürich’s official website

 Kongresshaus Zürich
 Tonhalle planet-zurich.com 

Concert halls in Switzerland
Music venues completed in 1895
Tourist attractions in Zürich
Fellner & Helmer buildings
Cultural venues in Zürich
19th-century architecture in Switzerland